Bob Brock is a retired college softball coach.  He is most notable for his time as head coach of Texas A&M, during which his teams won three national championships, finished as national runner-up twice, and made two additional appearances in the Women's College World Series.  He later served as head coach of the Tampa Bay Firestix of the Women's Pro Softball League and Sam Houston State.  Brock won his 1,000th game in 2012, and was inducted into the National Fastpitch Coaches Association Hall of Fame in 2016.

References

Living people
Baylor Bears softball coaches
Texas A&M Aggies softball coaches
Sam Houston Bearkats softball coaches
Tennessee Volunteers softball coaches
Sam Houston State University alumni
Year of birth missing (living people)